Governor Duncan may refer to:

John Duncan (diplomat) (born 1958), Governor of the British Virgin Islands from  2014 to 2017
Jonathan Duncan (Governor of Bombay) (1756–1811), Governor of Bombay from 1795 to 1811